Luke Boyd (born December 13, 1977), better known by his stage name Classified, is a Canadian rapper and record producer from Enfield, Nova Scotia.

Musical career

1995–2004: Early beginnings 
Boyd attended Hants East Rural High School in Milford Station, Nova Scotia. He started his own production label, Half Life Records, and released his first full-length LP called Time's Up, Kid in 1995.

After years of working on music, including eight studio albums and sorting through label contracts, Boyd produced, recorded, and released his ninth album, Trial & Error, and signed a nationwide distribution deal with Toronto-based URBNET Records in 2003. Containing collaborations with up-and-coming Canadian artists like Eternia and DL Incognito, as well as Canadian rap veteran Maestro, the album was one of the highest-selling independent rap albums in Canada in 2004.

With the support of Canadian grant foundation VideoFACT, Boyd was able to release two music videos for the singles "Just the Way It Is" and "Unexpected".  Boyd continued to develop his production skills and worked alongside prominent MCs in Canada including Choclair and Maestro Fresh Wes. He also collaborated with Shady Records recording artist Royce da 5'9" and opened for Ludacris, Snoop Dogg, Busta Rhymes, The Game, Nelly, MC Grizzly, Captain Capota, Nas, The Black Eyed Peas and Black Moon.

2005–2007: Nationwide buzz and recognition 
Boyd's tenth album, Boy-Cott-In the Industry, marked a significant turning point is his career. The 2005 album includes guest appearances by Trent James, Royce Da 5'9", Jay Bizzy, J-Bru, A-Wall, Spesh K, and Mike Boyd (Boyd's younger brother and fellow MC). He has said he enjoys doing music with other people: "It keeps things exciting and there are tons of talented people in Halifax so you make connections 'cause it's not a huge scene." The album reached #46 on SoundScan's Canadian R&B/Hip-Hop albums chart. The singles "The Maritimes", "5th Element", "No Mistakes", and "Find Out", which is the lead single of his 11th studio album, Hitch Hikin' Music, were all Top 20 hits on MuchMusic and MTV Canada that year. The music video for "No Mistakes" won him an MMVA for MuchVibe Best Rap Video. Boy-Cott-In the Industry also earned a Juno Award nomination for Rap Recording of the Year in 2006.

Following Boy-Cott-In the Industry, Boyd released his eleventh album Hitch Hikin' Music. Like previous works, the album was self-produced. On "Fall From Paradise", Boyd reflects on the difficulty of staying fresh and on top. In the song "All About U", featuring singer Chad Hatcher, Classified shows the extent of his growth from his early releases. In "Hip Hop Star", he eschews the bling-bling culture of popular hip hop to remind people that life is not about trying to impress others. The rest of the album includes guest appearances by Jay Bizzy, Mic Boyd, Jordan Croucher, Preacher K, White Mic and more. Four singles have been released off the album: "Find Out" (which won the 2007 East Coast Music Award for Best Rap/Hip-Hop Single), "Feelin' Fine Remix", "All About U", and "Hard to Be Hip Hop". Hitch Hikin' Music also received a Juno Award nomination for Rap Recording of the Year in 2007.

2008–2017: Mainstream breakthrough and national success 
In 2008, Boyd signed his first major label deal with Sony Music and released his twelfth studio album, Self Explanatory, in 2009, which received highly positive reviews from critics, debuting on the Canadian Albums Chart at #25 making it Boyd's first album on that chart. The hit single "Anybody Listening" brought Boyd to mainstream success as it peaked at #52 on the Canadian Hot 100. The accompanying music video also received heavy rotation on MuchMusic. At the 2009 MuchMusic Video Awards on May 21, 2009, Boyd won the MuchVibe "Best Hip-Hop Video of the Year" award for "Anybody Listening" directed by Harv Glazer and produced by Robert Wilson of TwoThreeFiveFilms. He would also receive three Juno Award nominations in 2010, for Rap Recording of the Year, Single of the Year, and Video of the Year respectively. Boyd would enjoy more mainstream success with another hit single, "Oh...Canada". which peaked at #14 on the Canadian Hot 100 and was certified platinum in digital downloads by Music Canada. In early 2011, "Oh...Canada" received a Juno nomination for "Single of the Year".

On March 22, 2011, Boyd released his thirteenth album and second major studio album, Handshakes and Middle Fingers. The album debuted at #7 on the Canadian Albums Chart. The first single from the album, "That Ain't Classy", reached #45 on the Canadian Hot 100. "That Ain't Classy" also featured in the EA Sports football game Madden 12. Another song featured on the album, "Run With Me", was included in the soundtrack for NHL 13, another EA Sports title. In 2012, Boyd signed with Universal Music.

In 2013, Boyd would reach the height of his music career with the release of his fourteenth album, eponymously titled Classified, which debuted at #1 on the Canadian Albums Chart, earning him his first chart-topping album that would eventually be certified Platinum by Music Canada. The first single from the album, "Inner Ninja", reached #5 on the Canadian Hot 100, earning Boyd his first top-ten hit and highest-charting song. The song has been certified 5× Platinum in digital downloads by Music Canada.

In March 2013, it was announced that Boyd signed a deal with Atlantic Records. Boyd won an award at the 2013 Juno Awards for "Rap Recording of the Year" for his song "Inner Ninja". A remix of the song featuring guest vocals from Olly Murs was released on November 10, 2013.

In March 2014, Boyd co-hosted the 2014 Juno Awards along with Serena Ryder and Johnny Reid, and released a new single "Higher" featuring B.o.B.

On January 15, 2016, Boyd released his fifteenth album Greatful. Three singles were released: "Filthy" which features DJ Premier, "No Pressure" which features Snoop Dogg (and which reached #65 on the Canadian Hot 100) and "Noah's Arch" which features Saukrates. The album debuted #6 on the Canadian Albums Chart. Boyd announced he would be touring across Canada from February to March in support of the album.

Boyd co-wrote and produced Ria Mae's hit song Thoughts On Fire and raps on the Thoughts on Fire (feat. Classified) version which was on heavy rotation in early 2017 on the CBC Radio 2 network.

2018–present: Longevity and latest projects 
On February 9, 2018, Boyd filmed a music video for "Powerless" in Nova Scotia, featuring native dancers and musicians and bringing to light the issues surrounding missing and murdered indigenous women and girls. On May 8, 2018, Boyd released another new single called "Changes" featuring Anjulie. On May 25, 2018, Boyd released another single "She Ain't Gotta Do Much". Later that month, Boyd announced his new EP Tomorrow Could Be.... The EP was released on June 29, 2018. On September 14, 2018, Boyd announced that his new album Tomorrow Could Be the Day Things Change would be released on October 12. The first single from the album, "Cold Love", featuring Tory Lanez, was released the same day.

On September 20, 2020, Boyd released an EP called Time. "Good News" which features Breagh Isabel was one of the singles off the EP, it was certified Gold in Canada, and appeared on John Krasinski's ‘Some Good News’.

On June 29, 2022, Boyd released Retrospected (Acoustic) which is an album consisting of acoustic versions of all his hit singles.

Personal life
Boyd is married to Kim Boyd and together they have three children. He has a song named "Having Kids Is Easy" on his 2016 album Greatful, dedicated to his daughters. He has two brothers, Mike and Jake Boyd, and one sister, Leah Boyd. Mike is a frequent collaborator with Classified and has produced multiple albums with him.

Discography

Studio albums
 Time's Up, Kid (1995)
 One Shot (1996)
 What Happened (1996)
 Information (1997)
 Now Whut! (1998)
 Touch of Class (1999)
 Unpredictable (2000)
 Union Dues (2001)
 Trial & Error (2003)
 Boy-Cott-In the Industry (2005)
 Hitch Hikin' Music (2006)
 Self Explanatory (2009) 
 Handshakes and Middle Fingers (2011)
 Classified (2013)
 Greatful (2016)
 Tomorrow Could Be the Day Things Change (2018)

EPs
 iTunes Session (2013)
 Tomorrow Could Be... (2018)
 Time (2020)

Compilations
 While You Were Sleeping (2007)

Remix albums
 Retrospected (Acoustic) (2022)

Mixtapes
 The Joint Effort (2012)

Awards and nominations

Books 

 Classified: Off the Beat 'N Path (2021) - #1 Best Seller on Amazon Pop Music Books

See also

Canadian hip hop
Music of Canada

References

External links
 Classified Official website
 Classified Official HalfLife Records website

1977 births
20th-century Canadian male musicians
20th-century Canadian rappers
21st-century Canadian male musicians
21st-century Canadian rappers
Canadian hip hop record producers
Canadian male rappers
Canadian songwriters
Juno Award for Rap Recording of the Year winners
Living people
Musicians from Halifax, Nova Scotia
Writers from Halifax, Nova Scotia